Park So-yeon (born Park In-jung on October 5, 1987), referred to as Soyeon, is a South Korean singer and actress. She debuted as a member of girl group T-ara in July 2009, which went on to become one of the best-selling girl groups of all time. She debuted as a solo artist in 2021.

Early life and education
Park was born Park In-jung on October 5, 1987, in Andong, North Gyeongsang Province, South Korea. She has legally changed her name to Park So-yeon. In 2005, she took part and was awarded the Gold Award for the CMB Chin Chin Singing Competition. Park has studied at the prestigious Anyang High School of Arts, located in Anyang, Gyeonggi, South Korea.

Park was formerly a trainee under SM Entertainment, preparing to be a member and supposed to be the leader of girl group Girls' Generation. However, she left the company six months before their debut due to personal circumstances. After debuting with T-ara, she revealed on the tvN's show Taxi that at that time she felt the opportunity came so easily and she was in two minds, not fully prepared for the debut.

Career

2009–2011: Career beginnings

Park was the second new member to be added to T-ara after two former members Jiae and Jiwon left the group in mid-2009.

In 2010, she was rushed to the hospital after complaints of not feeling well while filming for her cameo role in Master of Study. She was then diagnosed with H1N1 while T-ara was still promoting the follow-up track Like The First Time off of their first full-length album, Absolute First Album.

Park participated in the OSTs for the movie Death Bell 2: Bloody Camp and the SBS drama Coffee House.

In 2011, she was a fixed cast member for KBS's variety show 100 Points Out Of 100.

2012–2013: Acting roles and QBS

Park participated in the musical adaption of T-ara's hit song Roly-Poly, which opened on January 13, 2012, at the Seongnam Arts Center. She has stated that it is one of her dreams to stand on stage and act on it.

She replaced Hyomin as T-ara's new leader starting on December 7, 2011, for their Lovey-Dovey promotions. She is the fourth leader of T-ara after Eunjung, Boram, and Hyomin. In July 2013, she stepped down as leader and Qri became the fifth leader.

Park appeared in the KBS drama Lovers of Haeundae as Lee Gwan-soon. The drama aired on August 13, 2012.

Soyeon along with Qri and Boram formed a sub-group called QBS in May 2013. The sub-group focused on the Japanese market. They released their debut single titled "Kaze no You ni" (風のように, Like the Wind) on June 26, 2013.

2017–present: Departure from MBK Entertainment
On March 6, 2017 MBK announced that T-ara would be releasing their last album as a six-member group in May, after Boram and Soyeon's contracts ended, and the other members would remain until December 31, 2017. On May 7, MBK Entertainment revealed the group's plans had changed and that the new album's release had been rescheduled to June 2017, with Boram and Soyeon not participating due to the expiry of their contracts. On May 8, it was announced that T-ara's last performance as a six-member group would be in Taiwan concert on May 13.

On July 11, 2020, it was announced that Park had signed with Think Entertainment.

Other ventures

Endorsements 
In February 2021, Soyeon became the exclusive model for the Korean tea brand "HOBEATEE". In March 2021, the brand announced a 100% sold-out. It was also mentioned that Soyeon helped the brand's image by drawing attention from both domestic users and her overseas Chinese fans.

Personal life

Relationship 
On January 18, 2022, Park's agency confirmed that she will marry soccer player Cho Yu-min in November 2022. They have been in a relationship for 3 years. Later, it was announced the wedding ceremony in November has been postponed until next year, due to Cho Yu-min joined the national team and planning to focus for the 2022 FIFA Qatar World Cup. But the couple had already registered their marriage and were a legal couple.

Other 
On September 22, Soyeon revealed through her Instagram that she bought her mother a 3-volume apartment in Seoul's green forest area.

Discography

Singles

As main artist

Collaborations

Soundtrack appearances

Other albums appearances

Filmography

Films

Television series

Web series

Variety shows

Hosting

Musical

Accolades

Awards and nominations

Listicles

Notes

References

External links

1987 births
K-pop singers
T-ara members
South Korean women pop singers
South Korean female idols
South Korean television actresses
Living people
MBK Entertainment artists